Joaquín Valle Benítez (18 April 1916 – 24 December 1980) was a Spanish professional football striker known mainly for his stint with French club OGC Nice.

Career 
Valle was born in Las Palmas de Gran Canaria, Spain. Along with his brother Luis, he joined OGC Nice in 1937 during the club's off-season. He spent a decade at the club becoming Nice's all-time leading goalscorer. In league matches, Valle scored 186 goals in 229 appearances. In total with the team, he scored 339 goals in 407 appearances. In July 1948, Valle left the club to return to Spain and played for RCD Español.

References 

1916 births
1980 deaths
Association football forwards
Spanish footballers
OGC Nice players
Ligue 2 players
RCD Espanyol footballers
La Liga players